The Vermilion Inn, better known as Café Vermilionville, is a historic building located at 1304 Pinhook Road in Lafayette, Louisiana.

Built c.1835, the inn is a two-story Greek Revival structure located near the bank of Vermilion River. Originally in a rural landscape, it's now located in the middle of expanding suburbs of Lafayette. The area where it is located was the site of the Battle of Vermillion Bayou of 1863, at which time the structure was occupied by Union troops.

The building was listed on the National Register of Historic Places on July 13, 1983.

See also
 National Register of Historic Places listings in Lafayette Parish, Louisiana

References

Hotel buildings on the National Register of Historic Places in Louisiana
Greek Revival architecture in Louisiana
Hotel buildings completed in 1835
Lafayette Parish, Louisiana
National Register of Historic Places in Lafayette Parish, Louisiana